Anthene bipuncta is a butterfly in the family Lycaenidae. It is found in the Democratic Republic of the Congo (Uele, Équateur and Sankuru) and the Republic of the Congo.

References

Butterflies described in 1921
Anthene